William J. Althaus is a former American politician who served as Republican mayor of York, Pennsylvania for 12 years between 1982 and 1994. During this time he was also selected to be the 49th President of the United States Conference of Mayors for its 1992 to 1993 session.

Political Career

Mayor of York

As mayor, Althaus sought to turn York into a hub for Soviet and Russian immigrants following the fall of the iron curtain. During his tenure as mayor Althaus celebrated the 125th anniversary of the occupation of York by the Confederate States of America joking to the Confederate reenactor it wouldn't be as easy this time around due to the York police department which hadn't existed at the time of the occupation. He co-moderated the 86th annual convention of the Pennsylvania League of Cities in 1985. Althaus was also an advocate for smokers rights, seeking to ensure national federal protection for the freedom of individuals to smoke in public. During his time as mayor he also served as a delegate to the 1992 Republican National Convention.

President of the United States Conference of Mayors

Before his appointment as the Conference's president, Althaus had been an active member attending every meeting since his election to mayor of York. When he was chosen as president, besides fostering a working relationship with the Clinton administration, the main goal of his 1992 to 1993 term would be to increase federal funding to cities. During the Bush Administration and the Reagan Administration federal mandates increased, while the funding for federal mandates was cut. Althaus, and the Conference petitioned to either increase funding so that the mandates may be carried out, or to cut the number of mandates so the funding can cover all of them.

Post-mayoral career

After exiting the office of mayor Althaus has remained an influential member of the local community mostly due to him being the last Republican to hold the office of mayor to date. He has worked with several other more recent mayors to help with issues such as race relations.

References

Pennsylvania Republicans
20th-century American politicians
Mayors of York, Pennsylvania